Edna Ernestine Kramer Lassar (May 11, 1902 – July 9, 1984), born Edna Ernestine Kramer, was an American mathematician and author of mathematics books.

Kramer was born in Manhattan to Jewish immigrants. She earned her B.A. summa cum laude in mathematics from Hunter College in 1922. While teaching at local high schools, she earned her M.A. in 1925 and Ph.D. in 1930 in mathematics (with a minor in physics) from Columbia University with Edward Kasner as her advisor. 

She wrote The Nature and Growth of Modern Mathematics, A First Course in Educational Statistics, Mathematics Takes Wings: An Aviation Supplement to Secondary Mathematics, and The Main Stream of Mathematics.

Kramer married the French teacher Benedict Taxier Lassar on July 2, 1935. Kramer-Lassar died at the age of 82 in Manhattan of Parkinson's disease.

Works 
 The Main Stream of Mathematics  (1951)
 The Nature and Growth of Modern Mathematics (1970)

References

External links 
 Biography from Agnes Scott College
 MacTutor biography
  Biography on p. 335-337 of the Supplementary Material at AMS

1902 births
1984 deaths
Hunter College alumni
Columbia Graduate School of Arts and Sciences alumni
People from Manhattan
20th-century American mathematicians
American women mathematicians
Neurological disease deaths in New York (state)
Deaths from Parkinson's disease
20th-century women mathematicians
Mathematicians from New York (state)
20th-century American women